The 500 class were a class of South Australian Railways diesel shunter locomotives built at Islington Railway Workshops between 1964 and 1969.

History
Thirty-four 500 class locomotives were built, all incorporating English Electric traction and control equipment. The first 27 were built with broad gauge bogies; the last seven with standard gauge bogies. They operated in yards at Gladstone, Murray Bridge, Naracoorte, Peterborough, Port Pirie, Tailem Bend and Wallaroo, and were deployed extensively in Adelaide.

In March 1978 all were included in the transfer of the South Australian Railways to Australian National. Some were transferred to Port Augusta. In 1986, a new computer system required the class leaders of the former South Australian Railways to be renumbered as the last member of the class, with 500 becoming 534.

Most were scrapped in the mid-1990s, and the remaining locomotives were included in the sale of Australian National's South Australian operations to Australian Southern Railroad in October 1997.

Surviving locomotives
507 owned by SteamRanger, where it is commonly used on Cockle Train duties between Goolwa and Victor Harbor
508 owned by Genesee & Wyoming Australia, stored at Whyalla, South Australia
515 preserved at the National Railway Museum, Port Adelaide as their standard gauge shunter
517 was donated to the National Railway Museum, Port Adelaide by Genesee & Wyoming Australia, stored
518 is privately owned, stored at the Newport Railway Workshops, Victoria.
527 was donated to SteamRanger by Australian Railroad Group in October 2010
532 was donated to Steamtown Heritage Rail Centre by Genesee & Wyoming Australia in June 2012
533 (renumbered 53) owned by Bluebird Rail Operations, Islington Railway Workshops, stored.

References

Bo-Bo locomotives
English Electric locomotives
Railway locomotives introduced in 1951
500
Standard gauge locomotives of Australia
Broad gauge locomotives in Australia
Diesel-electric locomotives of Australia